The following is a timeline of the history of the city of Nagoya, Japan.

Prior to 20th century

 1612 – Nagoya Castle and its Honmaru Palace built.
 1684 – Poet Bashō visits Nagoya.
 1714
 Fugetsudo Magosuke publisher in business.
 Tōgan-ji a Buddhist temple was moved to Nagoya.
 1776 – Eirakuya Toshiro publisher in business.
 1790s – Booksellers' guild established.
 1814 – Hokusai Manga published by Eirakuya Toshiro.
 1838 - Birthplace of cloisonné enamelling in Japan. 
 1868 – Aomatsuba Incident occurs.
 1871 – Nagoya Shimbun (newspaper) begins publication.
 1872 – Aichi Prefecture formed.
 1873 - A gold-plated dolphin from Nagoya Castle was displayed at the Vienna World's Fair.
 1881 – Nagoya Chamber of Commerce and Industry founded.
 1886 – Tokaido Line begins operating; Nagoya Station opens.
 1887 – Population: 149,756.
 1889 – Municipal government established.
 1890 – Population: 170,433.
 1891 – October 28: The 8.0  Mino–Owari earthquake affects the Gifu region. This oblique-slip event killed over 7,200, injured more than 17,000, and created fault scarps that still remain visible.

20th century

 1903 – Population: 284,829.
 1910 – Matsuzakaya (shop) in business.
 1912 – Aiyu Photography Club formed.
 1915
  Kintetsu Nagoya Line begins operating.
  (newspaper) in publication.
 1916 – Catholic Nanzan University founded.
 1918 – Rice riot occurs.
 1920 – Population: 619,529.
 1922
 Transportation Bureau City of Nagoya established.
  constructed.
 1929 – November:  conference held in Nagoya.
 1930 – Population: 926,141.
 1935 – Tokugawa Art Museum opens.
 1936 – Nagoya Baseball Club and Nagoya Golden Dolphins baseball team formed.
 1937
 Nagoya Pan-Pacific Peace Exposition (1937) held.
 Higashiyama Zoo and Botanical Gardens founded.
 1938 – Kintetsu Nagoya Station opens.
 1940 – Population: 1,328,084.
 1941
  established.
 Meitetsu Nagoya Station and Mizuho Athletic Stadium open.
 1942
 April 18: Bombing of Nagoya in World War II begins.
 Chunichi Shimbun (newspaper) in publication.
 1944 – Mizuho city ward established.
 1945 – Population: 597,941.
 1948
 Chunichi Dragons baseball team active.
 Pachinko parlor and Nagoya Baseball Stadium open.
 1949
 Nagoya Stock Exchange established.
 Nagoya Racecourse opens.
 Marushin Bussan pachinko manufacturer in business.
 1950 – Population: 1,030,635.
 1953 – Nikkatsu Theatre opens.
 1955 – Nagoya Festival begins.
 1956 – Nagoya designated a government ordinance city.
 1957 – Subway begins operating.
 1959
 September: Ise-wan Typhoon occurs.
 Nagoya Castle reconstructed.
 Sister city relationship established with Los Angeles, USA.
 1962 – Nagoya Television Broadcasting begins.
 1964
 Tōkaidō Shinkansen (hi-speed train) begins operating.
 Aichi Prefectural Gymnasium built.
 1975
 "16 Wards system" established.
 Population: 2,080,000.
 1985 –  becomes mayor.
 1987 – Nippon Rainbow Hall (arena) opens.
 1988 – Nagoya City Art Museum opens.
 1989
 Nagoya City Archives established.
 Subway Sakura-dōri Line begins operating.
 Takaoka Station opens.
  held in city.
 1990 – Population: 2,154,793.
 1993 – Nagoya City Minato Soccer Stadium opens.
 1994 – Toyota Commemorative Museum of Industry and Technology established.
 1997
 Nagoya Dome (stadium) opens.
 International RoboCup robotics contest held in city.
 Takehisa Matsubara becomes mayor.
 1999 – Nagoya Station built.
 2000
 JR Central Towers built.
 Population: 2,171,378.

21st century

 2005 – Expo 2005 held near city.
 2009 – Takashi Kawamura becomes mayor.
 2010
  constructed.
 Population: 2,263,894.
 2011
 March: 13  held.
 Use of Manaca fare card on public transit begins.
 2026
 19 September-4 October: 20th Asian Games held.
 6th Asian Para Games held.

See also
 Nagoya history
 Timeline of Nagoya (in Japanese)

References

This article incorporates information from the Japanese Wikipedia.

Bibliography

External links

 Maps of Nagoya, circa 1945
 Items related to Nagoya, various dates (via Europeana).
 Items related to Nagoya, various dates (via Digital Public Library of America).

 
Nagoya
Years in Japan